St Martin at Oak, Norwich is a Grade I listed redundant parish church in the Church of England in Norwich.

History

The church is medieval dating from before 1491. It was destroyed by bombing in January 1942. It was rebuilt in 1953 by the architect John Chaplin as a church hall for neighbouring parishes, but this never materialised as the local churches were closed in the 1960s. After a period of use as a night shelter by the St Martins Housing Trust, the church was transformed into Oak Studios, a rehearsal space for theatre and music groups.

Organ

The church purchased an organ dating in 1887 by Norman and Beard. A specification of the organ can be found on the National Pipe Organ Register. When the church closed for worship, the organ was transferred to St Bartholomew's Church, Corton, Suffolk.

References

Martin
Grade I listed churches in Norfolk
British churches bombed by the Luftwaffe